Victoria Hill is a hill in the city of Riverside, California which is the seat of Riverside County, California.

References

Hills of California
Geography of Riverside, California
Mountains of Riverside County, California
Temescal Mountains